Pyrgulina pupaeformis is a species of sea snail, a marine gastropod mollusk in the family Pyramidellidae, the pyrams and their allies.

Distribution
This marine species occurs in the Gulf of Thailand and off Vietnam; also off New Caledonia.

References

 Saurin, E. 1959. Pyramidellidae de Nhatrang (Vietnam). Annales de la Faculté des Sciences (Saigon) 1959: 223-283, pls. 1-9 page(s): 248
 Dunker, W. (1860). Neue japanische Mollusken. Malakozoologische Blätter. 6: 221-240
 Peñas A. & Rolán E. (2017). Deep water Pyramidelloidea from the central and South Pacific. The tribe Chrysallidini. ECIMAT (Estación de Ciencias Mariñas de Toralla), Universidade de Vigo. 412 pp.

External links
 To World Register of Marine Species
 Souverbie (S.-M.) & Montrouzier [X.. (1865). Descriptions d'espèces nouvelles de l'Archipel Calédonien. Journal de Conchyliologie. 13: 150-154, pl. 5]
 Dunker, W. (1860). Neue japanische Mollusken. Malakozoologische Blätter. 6: 221-240
  Folin L. de & Périer L. (1867-1887). Les fonds de la mer. Paris: Savy. 4 volumes. Dates after Rehder (1946), Proceedings of the Malacological Society of London, 27: 74-75. Vol. 1: 1-48 (1867), 49-112 (1868), 113-176 (1869), 177-256 (1870), 257-272 (1872), pls 1-32; Vol. 2: 1-64 (1872), 65-112 (1873), 113-124 (1874), 125-160 (1875), 161-208 (1873), 209-304 (1874), 305-360 (1875), 361-365 (1876), pls 1-11; Vol. 3: 1-96 (1876), 97-208 (1877), 209-304 (1879), 305-337 (1880), pls 1-9; Vol. 4: 1-32 (1881), 33-148 (1881-1884), 149-192 (1884-1887), 192-240 (1887), pls 1-15. Dates for plates not exactly known

Pyramidellidae
Gastropods described in 1865